Let the Music Play is the self-produced fifth album by American R&B singer Barry White, recorded in 1975 and released in January 1976 on the 20th Century label.

History
The album reached #8 on the R&B albums chart and peaked at #42 on the Billboard 200. It also reached #22 on the UK Albums Chart. The album yielded the Billboard R&B Top Ten single, "Let the Music Play", which was actually an outtake from his previous album Just Another Way to Say I Love You and peaked at #4. It also reached #32 on the Billboard Hot 100 and #9 on the UK Singles Chart. Another single, "You See the Trouble with Me", reached #14 on the R&B chart and #2 on the UK Singles Chart. A third single, "Baby, We Better Try to Get It Together", reached #29 on the R&B Chart, #92 on the Billboard Hot 100, and #15 on the UK Singles Chart. The album was digitally remastered and reissued on CD with bonus tracks on February 14, 2012 by Hip-O Select.

Track listing

Personnel
Barry White - lead vocals, arranger, conductor, design concept
Don Peake - orchestration 
Technical
Barney Perkins, Frank Kejmar - engineer

Charts

Weekly charts

Year-end charts

Singles

Certifications and sales

References

External links
 Let the Music Play at Discogs

1976 albums
Barry White albums
20th Century Fox Records albums